Sound Unlimited, formerly known as Sound Unlimited Posse and Westside Posse, was an Australian hip hop group from Sydney and the first Australian hip hop act signed to a major label (Sony BMG) during the 1990s. The band's members were: Rosano (El Assassin) and Tina Martinez (who were brother and sister), MC Kode Blue and Vlad DJ BTL.

History

Westside Posse originated from the western suburbs of Sydney in the Burwood subdivision in 1983. Their first recording, "Pull the Trigger", was a track on a compilation album, Down Under by Law, released by Virgin Records in 1988. Later in 1989 they became a dance, hip hop and pop group, Sound Unlimited Posse, with the line-up of Rosano "El Assassin" Martinez as rapper, Vladimir "DJ B.L.T." Cherapanoff (ex-Digits) and rapper Alan "Kode Blue". The group had members of Russian and mixed Spanish and Filipino origin. They rapped about "the evils of racism and the power of positivity" in their single, "Peace by Piece (By Piece Mix)", released in 1990. Also in that year they supported the Australian leg of tours by visiting international artists, Public Enemy, De La Soul and New Kids on the Block. After Martinez's younger sister, Tina, joined the group they shortened their name to Sound Unlimited.

They released three singles from their debut album, A Postcard from the Edge of the Underside (1992), with "Kickin' to the Undersound" (April 1992),  "Saturday Night" (October 1992) and "One More from the City" (April 1993). Members Def Wish and Sereck of Def Wish Cast appear b-boying in the film clip for "Saturday". The album title is inspired by the 1990 film, Postcards from the Edge, which is about a recovering drug addict. A Postcard from the Edge of the Underside was the only Australian rap album to be released by a major label (Columbia Sony) in the 1990s. This "breakthrough recording deal" was negotiated with the help of Public Enemy.

The group's origins in Sydney's western suburbs impacted the music they created. Those suburbs have residents, who are "traditionally regarded as real people, working-class, underprivileged and crime-ridden," and have substantial immigrant communities. They have significantly less access to the cultural and social capital of residents in more affluent, serviced suburbs, creating space for a different cultural form, that of underground hip-hop. Sound Unlimited publicly declared their underground status in that album title.

Despite major label support, the group received criticism from some in the Australian hip hop community as their music was, "slick and heavily instrumental" and also because of claims by the band to represent Sydney Hip Hop. They contributed to the Australian Hip Hop scene by supporting several other bands. They performed at the Big Day Out Music Festival in 1992.

The group split up in 1994, with Rosano and Tina forming the UK-based acid jazz band Renegade Funktrain with Tina's husband, Derek Antunes (a former drummer for New Kids on the Block's touring band).

In 2004, the A.S.K. Mix of  "One More from the City" featured on the various artists compilation album. 15.Oz Vinyl: 15 Years of Australian Hip Hop on Vinyl. It showcased early and important tracks in Australian hip hop. For the first time Sound Unlimited appeared with other key artists of the genre such as the AKA Brothers, Koolism, Def Wish Cast and Hilltop Hoods.

Discography

Studio albums

Singles

Awards and nominations

ARIA Music Awards
The ARIA Music Awards are a set of annual ceremonies presented by Australian Recording Industry Association (ARIA), which recognise excellence, innovation, and achievement across all genres of the music of Australia. They commenced in 1987. 

! 
|-
| 1994 ||  "One More from the City" || ARIA Award for Best Pop Release ||  ||

References

External links
 Sound Unlimited Posse artist profile on Discogs

New South Wales musical groups
Australian hip hop groups